Immobile Łuczniczka is a sport, show and fair arena in Bydgoszcz, Poland. In sport it is primarily used for volleyball and basketball, and also regularly hosts indoor track-and-field meetings.

The name was given in memory of the city's hallmark, the Archeress statue.

Events
In 2009 Łuczniczka hosted one of two second round stages of the EuroBasket 2009, as well as the preliminary round's Group C of the 2009 Women's European Volleyball Championships. In 2011 (from 18.06.2011 to 26.06.2011) in Bydgoszcz took place Women's European Basketball Championship  – the preliminary round's Group A and B.

Since 2003 Łuczniczka also hosted several matches of the FIVB World League (men's volleyball). Recently
also the Polish national handball team played its matches in Łuczniczka. The two Bydgoszcz teams competing in the Polish highest volleyball leagues (men's and women's) play its home matches in Łuczniczka.

In February 2010, Łuczniczka hosted the tennis match of the first round of the 2010 Fed Cup World Group II between the national teams of Poland and Belgium.

Gallery

See also
List of indoor arenas in Poland
Sport in Poland

References

External links

Official site of Łuczniczka

Indoor arenas in Poland
Sport in Bydgoszcz
Buildings and structures in Bydgoszcz
Sports venues in Kuyavian-Pomeranian Voivodeship
Basketball venues in Poland
Volleyball venues in Poland
Boxing venues in Poland
Mixed martial arts venues in Poland